Hammadi Daou (born 2 July 1968) is a Tunisian football manager who currently manages CS Sfaxien.

References

1968 births
Living people
Tunisian football managers
CS Sfaxien managers
Stade Gabèsien managers
EGS Gafsa managers
EO Sidi Bouzid managers
USM El Harrach managers
DRB Tadjenanet managers
US Tataouine managers
Tunisian expatriate football managers
Expatriate football managers in Saudi Arabia
Tunisian expatriate sportspeople in Saudi Arabia
Expatriate football managers in Algeria
Tunisian expatriate sportspeople in Algeria